Stephen Neil 'Steve' Foley (born 11 July 1957) is a former Australian diver. He competed at three successive Olympic Games and three Commonwealth Games.

Foley competed in the springboard and platform events at the 1976, 1980 and 1984 Olympics.  In the Commonwealth Games he won silver medals in both events at the 1982 Commonwealth Games in Brisbane, and also competed in 1978 and 1986.  He retired after the 1986 games, but remained involved in the sport as a coach.  He was Australia's head diving coach at the 1988 Olympics but switched to work for the British diving team in 1999. In 2008 he was appointed as the high performance director by USA Diving.

References

External links
 

1957 births
Living people
Divers at the 1976 Summer Olympics
Divers at the 1980 Summer Olympics
Divers at the 1984 Summer Olympics
Divers at the 1978 Commonwealth Games
Divers at the 1982 Commonwealth Games
Divers at the 1986 Commonwealth Games
Australian male divers
Olympic divers of Australia
Commonwealth Games silver medallists for Australia
Commonwealth Games medallists in diving
Australian Institute of Sport coaches
Medallists at the 1982 Commonwealth Games